St. Francis Xavier Catholic Secondary School (formerly known as Jean Vanier Catholic Secondary School) is an educational Catholic high school in Milton, Ontario, Canada. The 191,000 square foot building was built by the Halton Catholic District School Board in 2013. The school has been accepting enrolment for grades 9 through 12 since September 2013. The school's population has grown to over 2400 pupils and over 180 full-time staff members.

The school was originally named after the late Jean Vanier, a Canadian Catholic philosopher turned theologian, humanitarian and the founder of L’Arche. In June 2020, however, the Halton Catholic District School Board with approval from Douglas Crosby, Bishop of Hamilton, renamed the school for St. Francis Xavier following sexual misconduct allegations surrounding Jean Vanier.

The school mascot is the StFX Knight. Extra curricular student members (athletics, clubs, etc.) known as Knights.

See also
 List of high schools in Ontario

References 

Catholic secondary schools in Ontario
Educational institutions established in 2013
2013 establishments in Ontario
Milton, Ontario
Naming controversies